Hubert M. Houser (born October 9, 1942) was the Iowa State Senator from the 49th District. He served in the Iowa Senate from 2002, when he filled a vacancy left by Derryl McLaren's resignation, until 2013.  

Houser served on several committees in the Iowa Senate - the Agriculture committee; the Local Government committee; the Transportation committee; the Ways and Means committee; and the Economic Growth committee, where he is the ranking member.  He also serves on the Agriculture and Natural Resources Appropriations Subcommittee.  His prior political experience includes serving as a representative in the Iowa House from 1992 to 2001, serving on the Pottawattamie County Board of Supervisors from 1979 to 1993, and serving two terms on the Carson-Macedonia School Board.

Houser was re-elected in 2006 with 14,373 votes, running unopposed.

Education
Houser obtained his degree from Iowa State University.

Career
Outside politics Houser is a farmer.
Secretary of the Senate Michael Marshall told The Des Moines Register on Monday (April 7) that Sen. Hubert Houser was receiving his $144 daily expense payments and his $25,000 annual salary, though he hasn't voted on a measure since March 4.
Houser told the Register earlier he was too busy with work on his farm to join in legislative business, adding that as a Republican in the Democratic-controlled Senate, he had little to do.
On Monday, Houser told the Council Bluffs Daily Nonpareil he's willing to return his legislative pay to the state if anyone requested he do so.
Houser, a Republican, has served 22 years in the Legislature.

Organizations
Farm bureau
Cattleman's Association

Elected offices
Carson-Macedonia School Board (two years)
Pottawattamie County Board of Supervisors (1979-1993) 
Economic Development Authority Board
Iowa Economic Development Board
Iowa Power Fund Board

References

External links
Senator Hubert Housers official Iowa Legislature site
Senator Hubert Houser official Iowa General Assembly site
Senator Hubert Houser at Iowa Senate Republican Caucus
 

1942 births
Living people
People from Pottawattamie County, Iowa
Republican Party Iowa state senators
County supervisors in Iowa
School board members in Iowa